Alexander Mayeta Kerr (born February 22, 1977) is a first baseman with Industriales of the Cuban National Series. He was the play-off most valuable player in the National Series for the 2005–06 season.

Play-off MVP season
Industriales won their 11th title in 2005–06, and Mayeta put up solid numbers for the team, though there were many other players with comparable statistics in the National Series. Mayeta hit a respectable .315, and his 15 home runs and 71 RBIs led the team (tied for 11th and 13th in the league, respectively). However, he was seventh on the team in doubles, and his .555 slugging percentage was far off the league-leading pace set by Michel Enríquez of Isla de la Juventud (.690).

Comparison
The following is a comparison of Mayeta's numbers with the last two MVP award winners, Yulieski Gourriel and Osmani Urrutia, and two other stars of the league. Leaders are shown in bold.

References

1977 births
Living people
2009 World Baseball Classic players
Olympic baseball players of Cuba
Baseball players at the 2007 Pan American Games
Baseball players at the 2008 Summer Olympics
Olympic silver medalists for Cuba
Olympic medalists in baseball
Medalists at the 2008 Summer Olympics
Pan American Games gold medalists for Cuba
Pan American Games medalists in baseball
Central American and Caribbean Games gold medalists for Cuba
Competitors at the 2006 Central American and Caribbean Games
Central American and Caribbean Games medalists in baseball
Medalists at the 2007 Pan American Games